https://www.iruang.com/
George Hervey Hallett Jr. (1895–1985) was a civic activist and avid birder. As head of Citizens Union, a municipal watchdog group, he led the revision of the New York City Charter that was adopted by voters in 1975.

Hallett was born in 1895 to a Quaker family in Philadelphia, Pennsylvania. He attended Haverford College, received a master's degree in mathematics from Harvard University and a PhD from Pennsylvania University. He was a conscientious objector during World War I. Hallett was a prominent advocate of proportional representation in politics.

The  Hallett Nature Sanctuary in the southern end of New York City's Central Park was dedicated to his memory on June 30, 1986.

References

1895 births
1985 deaths
Haverford College alumni
University of Pennsylvania alumni
Harvard University alumni